Richard Thomas "R. T." Guinn (born February 10, 1981) is an American professional basketball player for Jämtland Basket. In March 2019, RT Guinn got a Swedish citizenship.

College career
Guinn was born in Bryan, Texas, and played high school basketball at Cibola High School and Valley High School in Albuquerque, New Mexico. After high school, he played college basketball at the University of New Mexico, with the New Mexico Lobos, during the 1999–2000 season. He then transferred to Baylor University, where he was a member of the Baylor Bears, from 2000 to 2004.

Professional career
In his pro career, Guinn has played with the following clubs: Salon Vilpas of the Finnish League, Södertälje Kings of the Swedish League, Eisbären Bremerhaven of the German League, Darüşşafaka of the Turkish League, Poltava-Basket, Azovmash Mariupol, Budivelnyk, and Ferro-ZNTU of the Ukrainian League, and Panathinaikos of the Greek League.

He joined Panathinaikos in May 2013. On August 1, 2013, he signed with Stelmet Zielona Góra. He left them on December 3, 2013. He then signed with Maccabi Ashdod.

On June 27, 2014, he signed with Torku Konyaspor of Turkey for the 2014–15 season.

On August 1, 2015, he signed with Krasny Oktyabr of Russia. In late November 2015, he left the Russian club. On January 20, 2016, he signed for the rest of the season with Bandırma Kırmızı of the Turkish Basketball Second League.

On July 22, 2016, Guinn signed with Hitachi SunRockers of the Japanese B.League.

On October 31, 2017, Guinn signed with Hungarian club Atomerőmű SE.

On August 20, 2018, Guinn signed with Swedish club Jämtland Basket.

References

External links
Eurocup Profile
Eurobasket.com Profile
FIBA.com Profile
Draftexpress.com Profile 
Greek Basket League Profile
French League Profile 
TBL Profile
Baylor Bears College Bio 

1981 births
Living people
American expatriate basketball people in Finland
American expatriate basketball people in France
American expatriate basketball people in Germany
American expatriate basketball people in Greece
American expatriate basketball people in Hungary
American expatriate basketball people in Israel
American expatriate basketball people in Japan
American expatriate basketball people in Poland
American expatriate basketball people in Russia
American expatriate basketball people in Sweden
American expatriate basketball people in Turkey
American expatriate basketball people in Ukraine
American men's basketball players
Atomerőmű SE players
Basketball players from Texas
Basket Zielona Góra players
Baylor Bears men's basketball players
BC Azovmash players
BC Budivelnyk players
BC Krasny Oktyabr players
BC Zaporizhya players
Centers (basketball)
Darüşşafaka Basketbol players
Eisbären Bremerhaven players
Jämtland Basket players
Maccabi Ashdod B.C. players
New Mexico Lobos men's basketball players
Limoges CSP players
Panathinaikos B.C. players
Power forwards (basketball)
Södertälje Kings players
Sun Rockers Shibuya players
Torku Konyaspor B.K. players